One Screen was a Philippine pay television entertainment channel based in Mandaluyong. It was owned by MediaQuest Holdings, Inc. through Cignal TV. Starting test broadcasts in September 2019, it was officially launched on June 15, 2020, and was exclusive to Cignal platforms. One Screen was the fifth MediaQuest channel launched under the One branding, now known as the One Network Media Group.

The network permanently ceased operations on January 1, 2022, at 12:30 am coinciding with the celebration of New Year's Day.

Programming
One Screen's programming content consisted of local and Tagalog-dubbed foreign dramas and movies from various productions and distributors. Some TV5 and GMA programs were formerly aired on Fox Filipino, which itself had gone dark three weeks after One Screen's launch.

References

TV5 Network channels
Television networks in the Philippines
Defunct television networks in the Philippines
Television channels and stations established in 2019
Television channels and stations disestablished in 2021
2019 establishments in the Philippines
Cignal TV